Fred W. Berger (July 9, 1908 - May 23, 2003) was an American film editor. He was nominated for an Academy Award in the category Best Film Editing for the film The Hot Rock. He also won an Primetime Emmy Award and was nominated for seven more in the category Outstanding Picture Editing for his work on the television programs M*A*S*H and Dallas. Berger died in May 2003 of natural causes at his home in Westwood, California, at the age of 94.

Selected filmography 
 The Hot Rock (1972; co-nominated with Frank P. Keller)

References

External links 

1908 births
2003 deaths
People from New York (state)
American film editors
American television editors
University of Michigan alumni